Made in America is the tenth studio album by the American popular music duo Carpenters, released in June 1981. The final album by the duo to be released during Karen Carpenter's lifetime, it reached number 52 in the US and number 12 in the UK.

In 1985, Richard said "that was Karen's favorite album and is mine, out of all our projects".

Karen played drums in the studio for the first time since Horizon on the song "When It's Gone (It's Just Gone)", albeit in unison with veteran Nashville session drummer Larrie Londin, and she also played percussion on "Those Good Old Dreams" in tandem with Paulinho da Costa.

Promotion
To promote Made in America, Karen and Richard Carpenter appeared on several talk shows in 1981, including America's Top Ten on July 11,  The Merv Griffin Show on October 2 performing "(Want You) Back in My Life Again", and Good Morning America on October 12.

Track listing

Personnel
 Karen Carpenter – lead and backing vocals; drums and percussion on "When it's Gone"; percussion on "Those Good Old Dreams"
 Richard Carpenter – backing vocals, keyboards (piano, Fender Rhodes and Wurlitzer electric piano, celesta, ARP Odyssey), orchestration
 Tim May, Tony Peluso, Fred Tackett, Dennis Budimir – guitars
 Jay Dee Maness – pedal steel guitar
 Earl Dumler – oboe
 Tom Scott – tenor saxophone
 Gayle Levant – concert harp
 Joe Osborn – bass guitar
 Larrie Londin, Ron Tutt, John Robinson – drums
 Paulinho da Costa, Peter Limonick, Bob Conti – percussion
 Jerry Steinholtz – congas on "I Believe You"
 Carolyn Dennis, Stephanie Spruill, Maxine Willard Waters – background vocals
 The O.K. Chorale – backing vocals on "Because We Are in Love (The Wedding Song)"
 Peter Knight – orchestration on "Because We Are in Love (The Wedding Song)"
 Paul Riser – orchestration on "I Believe You"
 Daryl Dragon, Ian Underwood – synthesizer programming on "(Want You) Back in My Life Again"
 Bernie Grundman, Richard Carpenter – remastering at Bernie Grundman Mastering

Charts and certifications

Weekly charts

Certifications

References

External links
 The Carpenters - Made in America (1981) album releases & credits at Discogs

1981 albums
The Carpenters albums
A&M Records albums
Albums arranged by Paul Riser
Albums recorded at A&M Studios